The medium-duty version of the Ford F-Series is a range of commercial trucks manufactured by Ford since 1948.  Derived from the smaller F-Series pickup trucks, the medium-duty range is currently in its eighth generation.  Initially slotted between the F-Series pickup trucks and the "Big Job" conventionals, later generations were slotted below the L-Series "Louisville" trucks; the last two generations are the largest vehicles produced by Ford since its exit from the heavy-truck segment.

The medium-duty F-Series has been used for an extensive number of applications, offered as a straight (rigid) truck and a truck-tractor (for semitrailers) in multiple cab configurations.  Prior to the production of the Ford C-Series, the model line was also offered in a cab-over engine (COE) configuration; a cowled-chassis variant (the Ford B-series) was used for bus production.

Since 1999, the medium-duty F-Series has been included within the Ford Super Duty range, consisting of the Class 6-7 Ford F-650 and F-750; Class 8 versions of the F-750 have been produced since 2011.  The current generation of the F-650 and F-750 are manufactured by Ford in its Ohio Assembly facility (Avon Lake, Ohio), replacing a joint venture with Navistar International named Blue Diamond Truck Company LLC located in General Escobedo, Mexico.

First generation (1948-1952) 

For the 1948 model year, Ford introduced the F-Series as a dedicated truck platform.  Along with replacing the trucks introduced before World War II, the F-Series expanded Ford trucks into several product ranges.  Along with light-duty trucks, the medium-duty range was slotted below the "Extra Heavy-Duty"/"Big Job" commercial trucks..

The medium-duty F-Series was marketed as a 1½ ton F-5 and 2 ton F-6, in both conventional and cab-over engine (COE) configurations. The F-5 and F-6 also served as the basis for the B-Series bus chassis; produced primarily for school bus use, the B-series was a bare chassis aft of the firewall.

Shared with the light-duty F-Series, the F-5 was powered by a 226 cubic-inch inline-six with a 239-cubic-inch V8 as an option. For the 1951 model year, the medium-duty F-series received a facelift, including a new grille. Through 1951, a 254-cubic-inch inline-six was optional for the F-6; for 1952, the 226 was replaced by a 215-cubic-inch inline-six.

Second generation (1953-1956) 

Coinciding with the 50th anniversary of the Ford Motor Company, the second-generation F-Series was released for 1953.  Alongside the vehicle redesign, the series nomenclature underwent a revision, with the F-5 and F-6 becoming the F-500 and F-600, respectively.  The medium-duty range retained both conventional and COE cab configurations, as a tractor, straight truck, or bus chassis.

For 1956, F-Series medium-duty trucks shared the cab redesign of the light-duty trucks, including its wraparound windshield and vertical A-pillars.

For 1954, Ford ended production of the long-running Flathead V8, replacing it with a 239-cubic-inch Y-block V8; the 215-cubic-inch inline-six was expanded to 223 cubic inches.  For 1956, the V8 was expanded to 272 cubic inches.

Third generation (1957-1960) 

For the 1957 model year, the third-generation F-Series was released; medium-duty trucks introduced multiple design features that would remain part of the model line (in various forms) over the next two decades.  The clamshell hood returned, but was enlarged to the width of the fenders.  In another change, the grill was also enlarged, eliminating the gap between the hood and bumper.  For 1958, quad headlights were introduced (following their legalization).

A 223-cubic-inch inline-six was offered as a standard engine.  The Ford Y-block was carried over from the previous generation, expanded to 292 cubic inches for 1958.

The medium-duty model line was reduced by one, as the F-Series COE (C-Series) was replaced by the Ford C-Series tilt-cab COE.  Offering better egress and engine access, the tilt-cab design was produced for a single generation through the 1990 model year (one of the longest-running designs ever produced by Ford).

Fourth generation (1961-1966) 

The fourth-generation F-Series had the medium-duty trucks adopt the larger and wider cab introduced by the pickup trucks.  In place of sharing drivetrains with light-duty Ford trucks, the medium-duty Ford trucks were fitted with six-cylinder and V8 engines developed specifically for truck use.  The model range was expanded, with the F-700/750 shifted from the heavy-duty range to the medium-duty range.

The fourth generation marked the final generation that medium-duty trucks shared bodywork with light-duty Ford F-Series.  For 1961, F-800 and above trucks were given their own fascia (with a central slotted grille).

A Mercury version of this truck was also offered in Canada.

Fifth generation (1967-1979) 

The fifth-generation F-Series was introduced for the 1967 model year, with Ford diverging the design of its light-duty and medium-duty F-Series.  To streamline production costs, medium-duty trucks (and bus chassis) retained the cab and hood of light-duty trucks.  In place of Twin I-Beam suspension, a solid front axle was retained; redesigned front fenders to accommodate a wider front track (and larger wheels) were used.  The front fascia was derived largely from the fourth-generation heavy-duty F-Series, adopting a full-width grille between the headlamps.

In 1968, a Caterpillar V8 diesel was introduced, becoming the first medium-duty Ford conventional to offer a diesel engine.  To distinguish diesel versions, Ford added an additional "0" to the model designation, introducing the F-6000 and F-7000.

For 1970, Ford introduced L-Series range of conventional trucks.  The first Class 8 conventional truck not derived from the F-Series, the L-Series (nicknamed the Louisville Line) replaced the N-Series and the heavy-duty F-Series.  In another change, the stand-alone T-series designation for tandem-axle trucks (T-700 and above) was withdrawn.  While the F-900 and F-1000 were discontinued, the F-800 was adopted by the medium-duty range.

In 1973, the medium-duty range underwent a minor exterior revision.  Along with a redesign of "FORD" lettering on the hood above the grille, the headlamp surrounds were enlarged.  Alongside a white-painted grille, medium-duty trucks were offered with a chrome grille.

Sixth generation (1980-1999) 
For the 1980 model year, the medium-duty F-Series underwent its first complete redesign since 1967. As with its predecessor, the cab and interior were derived from the F-Series pickup trucks of the period, with medium-duty trucks adopting their own chassis, front fascia, drivetrain, and suspension. A two-door cab was standard, with a four-door crew cab offered as an option. The model range was carried over from the previous generation, with the F-600, F-700, and F-800; the B-Series denoted cowled bus chassis. The medium-duty F-series shared exterior styling derived from the larger L-Series trucks.

Shifting from the rectangular grille of the F-Series and Ranger to the trapezoidal grille of the L-Series conventional and CL-Series COE, the sixth-generation medium-duty F-Series trucks adopted a taller, narrower hoodline, requiring the return of separate fenders (for the first time since the 1957 "Big Job" trucks). A traditional rear-hinged hood was standard, but the optional forward-tilting hood (in the style of the larger L-Series trucks) quickly overtook it in popularity. As a running change during 1983 (for the 1984 model year), the medium-duty F-Series replaced "F O R D" with the Ford Blue Oval grille emblem, becoming the last Ford vehicle to do so.

At its launch, the medium-duty F-Series was offered with two gasoline V8 engines and two diesel V8 engines. A 370-cubic-inch V8 was standard, with an optional 429-cubic-inch V8; both were variants of the 460 V8 developed for commercial use. The 429 became standard fitment in 1991. At its 1980 introduction, the standard diesel option was an 8.2 L Detroit Diesel "Fuel Pincher" V8 (for F-600 and F-700 trucks); the 10.4 L Caterpillar 3208 V8 made a return (redesignating F-800s as F-8000s). In 1985, Ford introduced inline-six diesel engines produced in a joint venture with New Holland in Brazil; 6.6 L and 7.8 L inline-sixes were phased in to replace the Detroit Diesel V8 and the Caterpillar 3208. In place of adding an extra "0" to the model designation, versions with the New Holland engines wore "Diesel" badging. In 1992, Ford introduced Cummins 5.9 L B-series and 8.3 L C-series straight-six diesels, phased in to replace the Ford-New Holland engines.

During its 19-year production run, the sixth-generation medium-duty F-Series received few changes outside of powertrain revisions. After the 1984 logo change, the medium-duty F-Series did not have any exterior change (aside from engine badging) until 1995, when the forward-tilting hood was standardized with a more aerodynamic design; along with an enlarged grille, and the turn signals were relocated outboard of the headlamps. With the exception of its steering column, the medium-duty F-Series used the interior and dashboard of the 1980-1986 F-Series through its entire production.

Seventh generation (2000-2015) 

For the 2000 model year, Ford introduced the seventh generation of its medium-duty truck line.  Following the sale of the Aeromax/Louisville and Cargo heavy-truck ranges to Freightliner in 1997, these became the largest vehicles produced by Ford in North America.  Following the 1999 split of the F-Series into light- and heavy-duty vehicles, medium-duty trucks became part of the Super Duty range.  In another change, medium-duty trucks adopted the "x50" nomenclature used by Ford F-Series trucks since 1953, as the F-650 and F-750 Super Duty (the F-800 was dropped).

To decrease development costs on an all-new range of trucks, Ford entered into a joint venture with Navistar International, which sought to develop a replacement for the long-running International S-Series/4000-Series.  Named Blue Diamond Truck Company LLC, the agreement produced medium-duty trucks for both manufacturers.  While sharing a common chassis, Navistar and Ford sourced their bodywork separately; Navistar produced its own engines, while Ford used off-the-shelf powertrains.  In 2000, Ford introduced the F-650/F-750 Super Duty, while International introduced the 4000-Series (later the DuraStar) in 2002.

Sharing its cab with the F-250 and F-350, and offered in both XL and XLT trims, the medium-duty Super Duty trucks were offered in two-door and four-door cabs; for the first time, a SuperCab configuration (2+2 doors) was offered for medium-duty trucks.  Again produced with separate fenders, the only visible exterior parts shared with the previous generation were the headlight/turn signal clusters.  The design of the trapezoidal grille was largely adapted from Super Duty pickup trucks, with two vertical intake slots bordering a square grille.  For 2004, the exterior underwent its sole update, as the grille adopted the "three-slot grille" layout used across Ford vehicles.  For 2012, the interior underwent its first revision, adopting the interior revision introduced for 2011 Super Duty pickup trucks.

Powertrain
At its launch, the F-650 and F-750 were available with the Caterpillar 3126 (replaced by the C7) 7.2 L inline-six, the Cummins ISB 5.9 L inline-six, and the Ford PowerStroke engines 7.3L and 6.0 L V8. For the 2010 model year, Caterpillar exited the on-highway diesel engine market, leaving Cummins as the sole engine choice.  Expanded to 6.7 liters for 2007, the Cummins diesel comes with eight standard and optional horsepower ratings, and two vocational ratings.

In 2012, Ford introduced gasoline and gaseous (propane) engines for medium-duty trucks.

Eighth generation (2016–present) 

For the 2016 model year, Ford introduced an eighth generation of its medium-duty truck line.  Following the 2015 dissolution of the Blue Diamond Truck joint venture, Ford shifted medium-duty truck production from Mexico to its Avon Lake, Ohio assembly plant, alongside E-Series cutaway van chassis and F-53/F-59 motorhome/commercial stripped chassis.   As before, the F-650 and F-750 makes a return, extending into the Class 7 range.

Sharing the cab with the previous generation, the eighth generation abandons the shared Blue Diamond chassis for an all-new chassis developed by Ford; the carryover cab design was largely chosen to accommodate the needs of body manufacturers.  In another change, off-the-shelf powertrains were replaced by engines and transmissions produced by Ford.  As a replacement for the Cummins diesel, the medium-duty trucks adopt the 6.7 L Power Stroke V8 of the F-250/F-350 Super Duty pickup trucks.  The 6.8 L Triton V10 gasoline engine made its return, with an option for conversion to propane or compressed natural gas (CNG).  The six-speed 6R140 automatic transmission is the sole transmission for both engines; no manual transmission is offered.

As before, the medium-duty range is offered in two-door, four-door, and SuperCab (2+2 door) cab configurations.  The fenders and hoodline are revised slightly; the standard mesh grille abandons the three-slot configuration, centering the Ford Blue Oval emblem alone.  The model line shares its headlights with the Ford E-Series and hood vents with the 2011-2016 Ford Super Duty.

For 2021 production, the V10 was replaced by a 7.3 L V8, paired with a six-speed automatic transmission.  Ford reintroduced the F-600, a heavier-duty version of the F-550, which is equipped with more reinforced U-joints, frame, and front axle and powertrain of the medium-duty F-650 while using the aluminum cab structure and frame design of the F-250/F-550.

References

External links

 

F650
Medium trucks
Class 6 trucks
Class 7 trucks
Class 8 trucks